Burradon may refer to two villages in England:

Burradon, Northumberland, near Alnwick
Burradon, Tyne and Wear, which historically, was also in Northumberland